The Heart of a Man is a 1959 British drama film directed by Herbert Wilcox and starring Frankie Vaughan, Anne Heywood and Tony Britton. Its plot concerns a millionaire in disguise who gives a young man money to help him pursue his singing career. Featured songs by Vaughan include "The Heart Of A Man", "Sometime, Somewhere" and "Walking Tall".

Plot
Sailor Frankie Martin is offered a thousand pounds by an eccentric tramp if he can earn a hundred pounds in a week by honest means. Frankie tries his hand as a boxer, a bouncer and a commissionaire, and finally finds success as a singer. He also  falls for the charms of night club chanteuse Julie, and this leads to further success when he wins a recording contract.

Cast
 Frankie Vaughan – Frankie Martin 
 Anne Heywood – Julie 
 Tony Britton – Tony 
 Peter Sinclair – Bud 
 Michael Medwin – Sid 
 Anthony Newley – Johnnie 
 Harry Fowler – Razor 
 George Rose – Charlie 
 Harold Kasket – Oscar 
 Vanda Hudson – Cha Cha

Critical reception
In the Radio Times, David Parkinson gave the film two out of five stars, and wrote, "Veteran director Herbert Wilcox bowed out of films with this undistinguished and wholly unconvincing slice-of-life drama, which was produced by his actress wife Anna Neagle... Anthony Newley cashes in on a showy supporting role and Vaughan scored a chart hit with the title song."

References

External links

1959 films
1959 drama films
British drama films
Films directed by Herbert Wilcox
Films shot at Pinewood Studios
1950s English-language films
1950s British films